Brick Presbyterian Church is a historic Presbyterian church in Perry, Wyoming County, New York.  The Gothic Revival-style church was built in 1909 of randome ashlar Pennsylvania limestone.  It consists of a central octagonal structure housing the sanctuary surrounded by wings that give the structure a cruciform appearance.  It features a massive square crenellated bell tower.  It is a product of the Buffalo architectural firm of Green & Wicks.

The bricks for this church were made by James Russell Webster, whose property is also on the National Historic Registry.

It was listed on the National Register of Historic Places in 2007.

References

External links

Churches in Wyoming County, New York
Presbyterian churches in New York (state)
Limestone buildings in the United States
20th-century Presbyterian church buildings in the United States
Churches completed in 1909
Churches on the National Register of Historic Places in New York (state)
National Register of Historic Places in Wyoming County, New York
Gothic Revival church buildings in New York (state)
Green & Wicks buildings